Rossau may refer to:

Rossau, Saxony, a municipality in the district of Mittweida, Saxony, Germany
Rossau, Saxony-Anhalt, part of the town Osterburg in the district of Stendal, Saxony-Anhalt, Germany
Roßau, a part of the 9th district of Vienna, Austria